RAF Mount Pleasant  (also known as Mount Pleasant Airport, Mount Pleasant Complex or MPA) is a Royal Air Force station in the British Overseas Territory of the Falkland Islands. The airfield goes by the motto of "Defend the right" (while the motto of the islands is "Desire the right") and is part of the British Forces South Atlantic Islands (BFSAI).

Mount Pleasant was opened by Prince Andrew on 12 May 1985, becoming fully operational the following year. The station was constructed as part of British efforts to strengthen the defence of the Falkland Islands following the Falklands War. It remains the newest purpose-built RAF station and replaced previous RAF facilities at Port Stanley Airport.

History

Falklands War 
RAF Mount Pleasant is the newest permanent airfield in the Royal Air Force. The RAF previously had a small airfield at Stanley airfield after the end of the hostilities in 1982. During the Falklands War when the islands were occupied by Argentine military forces, British aircraft were sent to disable the runway with RAF Strike Command Vulcan bombers (Operation Black Buck) and Royal Navy Sea Harriers. The raids were moderately successful, and on the first Black Buck mission one  bomb hit the runway in the middle, disabling it. However, temporary repairs by Argentines engineers did allow C-130 Hercules transport aircraft to bring in supplies and take out casualties until the end of the conflict. At the end of hostilities the runway was fully repaired by British military engineers.

After the surrender of the Argentine ground forces on the islands, the British still faced the problem of potential Argentine air attacks from Argentina, so an aircraft carrier had to remain on station to guard the islands with its squadron of Sea Harriers until the local airfield was prepared for jet aircraft.  was the first to take guard duty, whilst  went north to change a main engine at sea. Invincible then returned to relieve Hermes which urgently needed to return to the UK for boiler cleaning. Invincible returned until she was relieved by the newly built , which was quickly rushed south and commissioned during the journey. Once the Port Stanley runway was available for jets, Illustrious was relieved by 23 Squadron operating the F-4 Phantom FGR.2. Initially stationed at RAF Stanley, the unit moved to Mount Pleasant upon its opening.

Construction 
In order to deter further Argentine aggression or invasion attempts, the British Government considered it necessary to enhance the military presence in the Falklands. However, the temporary military airfield at RAF Stanley was restricted by the length and strength of its runway. Therefore, in June 1983, the British Government announced that a new military airfield would be constructed at Mount Pleasant, the option being considered to be more cost effective and straightforward than upgrading RAF Stanley. It would also allow RAF Stanley to remain operational whilst the new airfield was constructed.

The Ministry of Defence reached a voluntary agreement to purchase  of farmland for £55,000, with severance compensation assessed at £100,000. To allow existing agricultural operations to continue, Mount Pleasant House and other farm facilities were relocated at a cost of £83,877.

The airfield at Mount Pleasant was constructed by Mowlem-Laing Amey Roadstone Construction, a consortium of British civil engineering and construction firms Mowlem, John Laing Group and Amey plc. At the construction stage the airfield was called the Falkland Island Strategic Airfield or FISA and was designed to accommodate military as well as civil wide-body aircraft, enabling efficiencies in the running costs and time taken to support the Falklands garrison. The construction and shipping of materials to the Falklands was expected to cost approximately £190 million. Additional costs included the provision of a road between Stanley and Mount Pleasant and the installation of communication and navigation aids, bringing the overall cost to approximately £215m. Construction began in Autumn 1983 and the new runway was expected to be available for use by April 1985, with the wider airfield complete by February 1986.

RAF Mount Pleasant was opened by Prince Andrew (who saw active duty during the Falklands War while serving in the Fleet Air Arm) on 12 May 1985 and became fully operational on 1 May 1986.

Protecting the Falklands 
Mount Pleasant's first flying unit, No. 23 Squadron, equipped with four McDonnell Douglas Phantom FGR.2, arrived from RAF Stanley on 21 April 1986. The Phantoms were joined by No. 78 Squadron on 22 May 1986, which was reformed from the former No. 1310 Flight, operating the Boeing Chinook HC1 and No. 1564 Flight, operating the Westland Sea King HAR3. Later in 1986, two Lockheed C-130 Hercules C1K of No. 1312 Flight, operating in the air-to-air refuelling role, moved to Mount Pleasant to support the Phantoms.Responsibility for the air-defence and of the Falklands and the Phantoms of No. 23 Squadron were transferred to No. 1435 Flight on 1 November 1988. Subsequently, the flight's Phantoms were replaced when four Panavia Tornado F3 arrived in the Falklands in July 1992.

No. 1312 Flight's Hercules C1K were withdrawn in April 1996, with the flight gaining a Vickers VC10 K4 for air-to-air refuelling and C-130 Hercules C3 in the transport role.

In September 2009, the Falklands' air-defence capability was enhanced when No. 1435 Flight's Tornado F3s were replaced by the Eurofighter Typhoon FGR4 in the quick reaction alert (QRA) role, at a cost of £1.56 million. To accommodate the Typhoon, a further £416,000 was spent on infrastructure improvements to the airfield.

As part of the RAF's wider upgrade of their Hercules, the C3 variant of No. 1312 Flight was replaced with a C-130J C5 in April 2010. A Lockheed TriStar K1 took over the air-to-air refuelling role from the VC10 K4 in October 2013, when the latter was withdrawn from RAF service. The TriStar itself was soon replaced, in February 2014, by an Airbus A330 Voyager KC3.

Chinook helicopters provided heavy-lift support until they were withdrawn in 2006. In 2015, the Chinooks were redeployed to Mount Pleasant. A flight of Westland Sea King helicopters for support and search and rescue was located at Mount Pleasant from November 2007 until April 2016.

Prince William served as a Sea King pilot on the station for six weeks during February and March 2012.

As of 1 April 2016, with the retirement of Westland Sea King the Islands' search and rescue function has been replaced by a commercial organisation, AAR, subcontracting the services to British International Helicopters for 10 years using two new AgustaWestland AW189s.

1312 Flight's Lockheed Martin C-130 Hercules, used for transport, search and rescue, and maritime patrol, was replaced with an Airbus A400M Atlas C1 in April 2018.

Facilities 
Mount Pleasant Complex has a wide range of social and sporting facilities including a gym, swimming pool, golf course, diving centre, kart racing, Laser Quest, library, cinema, bowling, climbing wall, and indoor and outdoor sports pitches. As of August 2010 it has the only cricket ground in the Falklands. There are two NAAFI shops, a NAFFI Bar, a Costa Coffee café, hairdressers, a medical centre, and an education centre on the base. BFBS Radio also maintains a live local station on the site. There is also a complex that includes a small shop which is owned and run by the Falkland Islands Company.

Role and operations

The station provides a base for air-defence and transport operations in the south Atlantic and is home to No. 905 Expeditionary Air Wing, part of British Forces South Atlantic Islands. The wing comprises three RAF flights, which operate a range of aircraft:

 Four Eurofighter Typhoon FGR4 are operated by No. 1435 Flight which provides air defence for the Falklands, South Sandwich Islands and South Georgia.
 No. 1312 Flight operates an Airbus Voyager KC2 which is used for air-to-air refuelling and transportation. The Voyager works alongside an Airbus A400M Atlas C1 providing tactical transport, maritime patrol, search and rescue and humanitarian assistance capabilities.
 Civilian firm, British International Helicopters (BIH), operates two Sikorsky S-61 for personnel and equipment transport. BIH also fly two AgustaWestland AW189s for search and rescue operations.

33 Engineer Regiment (EOD) provides constant support and is part of the Joint Service Falkland Islands Detachment which consists of RAF and RLC EOD teams. It is mainly located in Stanley but there is also a detachment at Mount Pleasant. The group's role is to destroy unexploded munitions from the Falklands War; to brief troops, tourists and citizens on which areas are safe; and to mark uncleared minefields.

There is also a Joint Communications Unit (JCU) providing the electronic warfare and command and control systems for the Royal Navy, British Army and Royal Air Force.

Based units 
Units based at Mount Pleasant Complex.

Royal Air Force
 No. 905 Expeditionary Air Wing
 No. 1312 Flight – 1x Voyager KC2 and 1x A400M Atlas C1
 No. 1435 Flight – 4x Typhoon FGR4
British Army 
 Infantry
 Falkland Islands Roulement Infantry Company
 Royal Artillery
 7th Air Defence Group (Detachment) – Sky Sabre air defence missile system

Royal Navy (Operating from Mare Harbour facilities five miles from the Mount Pleasant complex)

 HMS Forth

Joint service units 

 Engineering and Logistics Wing
 Base Support Wing
 Joint Communications Unit Falkland Islands
 Joint Service Explosive Ordnance Disposal Unit
 Joint Services Police and Security Unit
 Joint Services Signals Unit

Civilian 
 British International Helicopters - 2x Sikorsky S-61 and 2x AgustaWestland AW189

Airlines and destinations

Using the IATA airport code MPN, Mount Pleasant Complex also acts as the Falkland Islands' only international airport, along with its military role. Flights open to civilian passengers are operated twice each week. The Hercules C-130 Transport Force operating out of RAF Lyneham supplied a direct non-stop service from RAF Lyneham via Ascension, Wideawake Airfield. From Ascension the flight was direct involving in-flight refuelling from a C-130 tanker. The flight duration was usually about 12 hours down and 13 hours back. The last scheduled flight in the world involving in-flight refuelling was carried out by a crew of 24 Squadron in C-130 XV291 during the period 18–23 March 1989. This was the 650th and last of its type carried out by RAF Lyneham C-130s. Flights were then operated directly by the RAF using the Lockheed TriStars of 216 Squadron. Starting in autumn 2008, these flights were operated on behalf of the Royal Air Force by a civilian airline, Flyglobespan. Since the airline's bankruptcy in 2009, the flights have been operated by Air Tahiti Nui, Titan Airways, Air Seychelles and Hi Fly. The service is now operated by AirTanker using Airbus Voyager aircraft. They fly to and from RAF Brize Norton in Oxfordshire, with a refuelling stop at Cape Verde because the runway at RAF Ascension Island is closed. The repairs to the western side of the runway at Ascension Island are expected to be completed in Spring of 2023.

On 2 March 2012, the Argentinian President Cristina Fernández de Kirchner called for Aerolíneas Argentinas flights to Buenos Aires to replace LATAM Airlines flights to Chile. The idea of flights to Argentina was not supported on the islands, because this might result in Argentina having a monopoly on commercial flights and controlling all commercial air access.

On 2 April 2012, Uruguayan company Air Class Líneas Aéreas gained permission from the Uruguayan Ministry of Defence to start a commercial flight to the Falkland Islands.

Scheduled

Unscheduled

See also
 List of Royal Air Force aircraft squadrons
 Mare Harbour
 Military of the Falkland Islands

References

External links 

 
 UK Military Aeronautical Information Publication – Mount Pleasant (EGYP)

Mount Pleasant
Military of the Falkland Islands
Mount Pleasant
East Falkland
1985 establishments in the Falkland Islands
Airports established in 1985